Brenda Olive Fowlie (born May 15, 1953) is a  journalist and politician in the Canadian province of New Brunswick.  She was formerly a member of the Legislative Assembly of New Brunswick and a member of the cabinet.

A resident of Quispamsis, New Brunswick, Fowlie was first elected to the legislature in the 1999 election and was re-elected in 2003 by a very narrow margin.  She was originally declared the winner in 2003 by a margin of 16 votes and a recount delayed the swearing in of the cabinet and the first session of the legislature.  The results of the election were so close that Fowlie's uncertain victory meant the difference between a majority government for her Progressive Conservative Party of New Brunswick and a tie in seats with the PCs and the opposition New Brunswick Liberal Association.  The recount reaffirmed her victory increasing her margin to 18 votes.

Prior to her election to the legislature, Fowlie had been a member of her local school board and was elected to Quispamsis town council in 1995 and re-elected in 1998.  She wrote a column for local newspapers and hosted several news and public affairs programs on public access television.

She was sworn into cabinet as the Minister of Environment and Local Government on June 27, 2003 and resigned from cabinet on July 21, 2005 after the provincial ombudsman reported she had violated provincial privacy laws when she used personal information, from her department, on fellow MLA Stuart Jamieson to attack his character in the legislature and to reporters. She made a quick political recovery however when she was re-added to cabinet on February 14, 2006 as Minister of Energy.

She was defeated in her bid for a third term in the 2006 election and thus left the legislature and the cabinet.

References 

1953 births
Living people
Canadian newspaper journalists
Progressive Conservative Party of New Brunswick MLAs
Members of the Executive Council of New Brunswick
Women MLAs in New Brunswick
People from Kings County, New Brunswick
New Brunswick municipal councillors
Women municipal councillors in Canada
Canadian women journalists
21st-century Canadian politicians
21st-century Canadian women politicians
Women government ministers of Canada
Canadian women non-fiction writers